The Church of God, House of Prayer is a Pentecostal Holiness body of Christians.

History
The Church of God, House of Prayer, founded in 1939 by Harrison W. Poteat and incorporated in 1966, is doctrinally similar to the Church of God (Cleveland). They are Trinitarian and Arminian in theology, holding a premillennial view of eschatology. Other beliefs include the baptism of the Holy Ghost, evidenced by glossolalia; water baptism by immersion; the Lord's supper and feet washing for believers only; and that the atonement provides not only for spiritual rebirth, but also for healing and deliverance from evil spirits.

Organization
In 1979, the Church of God, House of Prayer had 24 churches in the eastern United States, and 2 churches in eastern Canada.  The estimated membership was 1200.  Local congregations are "integral parts" of the General Assembly of the Church of God, House of Prayer, and are subject to the General Assembly and its officials. Headquarters are in Markleysburg, Pennsylvania.

Further reading
Encyclopedia of American Religions, J. Gordon Melton, editor
Profiles in Belief: the Religious Bodies of the United States and Canada, by Arthur Carl Piepkorn

External links
Adherents.com

Pentecostal denominations
Christian organizations established in 1939
Christian denominations established in the 20th century
1939 establishments in Pennsylvania
Holiness denominations